"That Was A River" is a song written by Susan Longacre and Rick Giles, and recorded by American country music singer Collin Raye that peaked at number 4 on the Billboard Hot Country Singles & Tracks chart. It was released in July 1993 as the fourth and final single from his CD In This Life.

Chart performance
The song debuted at number 68 on the Hot Country Singles & Tracks chart dated August 7, 1993. It charted for 20 weeks on that chart, and peaked at number 4 on the chart dated November 20, 1993.

Charts

Year-end charts

References

1993 singles
Collin Raye songs
Song recordings produced by Garth Fundis
Epic Records singles
Music videos directed by Sherman Halsey
Songs written by Rick Giles
Songs written by Susan Longacre
1992 songs